WNED-FM (94.5 MHz) is a non-commercial radio station licensed to Buffalo, New York.  WNED-FM offers a classical music radio format.  It is owned by the Western New York Public Broadcasting Association (formerly the Western New York Educational TV Association), doing business as Buffalo Toronto Public Media. The organization also operates PBS network affiliate Channel 17 WNED-TV and FM 88.7 WBFO (which offers a news/talk format and programming from NPR).  While WNED-FM airs no commercials, it does conduct periodic pledge drives on the air to seek donations for the station.  WNED-FM has local hosts in most day-parts, including weekends.

Programming on WNED-FM is simulcast on WNJA 89.7 FM in Jamestown, New York for listeners in Southwestern New York and some parts of Pennsylvania.  WNED-FM's studios and offices are at Horizons Plaza on Lower Terrace in Buffalo, and the transmitter is off Zimmerman Road in Hamburg, New York.  WNED-FM and TV also maintain an office in Toronto for listeners and contributors in Canada.

Superpower status
WNED-FM is a grandfathered "Superpower" Class B FM radio station, operating at 94,000 watts. WNED-FM is one of three Buffalo superpower FM stations: 92.9 WBUF, 99.5 WDCX-FM and 102.5 WTSS. Under current U.S. Federal Communications Commission rules, Class B FM's are not allowed to exceed 50,000 watts ERP.  WNED-FM at one time broadcast at 105,000 watts; however in 2012, it increased its antenna height due to "structural modifications" to the tower, at which time it also reduced its power.  WNED-FM's signal extends into Canada; as such, the station has listeners in Toronto and around the Niagara Peninsula of Ontario. However, WNED-FM may be difficult to tune in the Hamilton area, due to adjacent-channel interference from CHKX-FM 94.7.

History
WNED-FM first signed on as a commercial radio station on June 6, 1960, with the call letters WEBR-FM.  It was a sister station to WEBR (which at the time was at AM 970, a frequency now occupied by repeater WDCZ).  On September 24, 1971, WEBR-FM was renamed WBCE; on May 21, 1973, it became WREZ, before returning to the WEBR-FM call sign on April 21, 1975. In 1975, the Western New York Educational TV Association bought it and AM 970 WEBR, turning both stations into non-commercial operations. On August 14, 1976, 94.5 was renamed WNED-FM, and the following year began offering a classical music format with Peter Goldsmith becoming music director there until his retirement in October 2009 (he died the following year).  
WNED-FM, along with sister stations WBFO and WNED-TV, began collectively referring to themselves as "Buffalo Toronto Public Media" on February 4, 2020; concurrently, WNED-FM amended its own branding from "Classical WNED 94.5" to "WNED Classical". While the rebranding in part reflected WNED-TV's significant Canadian viewership and financial support, WNED officials told The Buffalo News that the organization's radio stations have minimal listenership in Canada.

In 2017, in honor of the station's 40th anniversary, it created the Top Classical 40 voted by the listeners who picked Dvorak's Symphony No. 9 on top. In October 2020, the station created its first ever ultimate Classical Top 100 playlist voted by the listeners with Beethoven's Symphony No. 9 taking the top spot, a title it retained for two consecutive years (2021 and 2022).

Local programming
WNED-FM has an extensive music library, which allows the station to produce local programming for most of its broadcast day. It collaborates with the Buffalo Philharmonic Orchestra (conducted by JoAnn Falletta, who has her own weekday morning feature JoAnn's Classical Corner) and other local ensembles as well as local school music departments.

HD Radio
WNED-FM operates in HD Radio. Its HD2 subchannel, which prior to November 2021 had carried a simulcast of WBFO, carries the JazzWorks network feed. JazzWorks had previously been heard on WBFO's subchannel before it launched an adult album alternative feed in its place in 2021.

Repeater

See also
WNED-TV
WDCZ
WQLN

References

External links

List of "grandfathered" FM radio stations in the U.S.

NED-FM
Classical music radio stations in the United States
NPR member stations
Radio stations established in 1960
1960 establishments in New York (state)